Talent Jackpot was an American game show broadcast on the DuMont Television Network from July 19 to August 23, 1949.

The show replaced Ted Steele's program. It was hosted by Broadway producer Vinton Freedley (1891-1969) with Bud Collyer as his assistant and announcer.

Contestants won by getting the most applause from the audience, and the top prize was $250. If a contestant won for three consecutive weeks, he or she received a one-week theater contract.

Radio
The Mutual Broadcasting System had a similar program. John Reed King was host of the radio version of Talent Jackpot, which was broadcast weekly. Applause from the audience determined each episode's winner, with a prize of $500 and "one week's engagement at a leading theatre in the country." Contestants could win no more than two weeks, receiving a maximum of $1,000 and two weeks at a theatre.

Episode status
As with most DuMont series, no episodes are known to exist.

See also
List of programs broadcast by the DuMont Television Network
List of surviving DuMont Television Network broadcasts

References

Bibliography
David Weinstein, The Forgotten Network: DuMont and the Birth of American Television (Philadelphia: Temple University Press, 2004) 
Alex McNeil, Total Television, Fourth edition (New York: Penguin Books, 1980) 
Tim Brooks and Earle Marsh, The Complete Directory to Prime Time Network TV Shows, Third edition (New York: Ballantine Books, 1964)

External links
 
DuMont historical website

DuMont Television Network original programming
1949 American television series debuts
1949 American television series endings
1940s American game shows
Black-and-white American television shows
English-language television shows
Lost American television shows